The Toluca–Mexico City commuter rail (Spanish: Tren Interurbano de Pasajeros Toluca-Valle de México) project is a  commuter rail line currently under construction. Also known as Interurban Train Mexico City–Toluca, the passenger railway line will connect the cities of Toluca and Mexico City. The project was announced by President Enrique Peña Nieto on 1 December 2012. Construction began in July 2014. As of October 2020, it was estimated to open in 2023.

Background
As a part of then-President Enrique Peña Nieto's plan to offer public transport from Toluca to Mexico City, a cost–benefit analysis report was drafted and published in November 2013. The report proposed several routes. The three routes were concentrated to the metro terminals of Cuatro Caminos, Tacubaya, and Observatorio. Ultimately, the third route along Avenida Las Torres to Observatorio was chosen in order to avert future sprawl, avoid deforestation in the Sierra de las Cruces, and prevent pollution of aquifers that supply water to residents.

The railway line will be electrified and elevated with a tunnel portion between the State of Mexico and Mexico City. There are six stations planned. Four stations will be located in the State of Mexico and the remaining two will be located in Mexico City. The line is designed to complement the Mexico City Metro by terminating at Observatorio station of Line 1 and provide heavy railway service to the Santa Fe business district. A shuttle will provide connection to Toluca International Airport at the Tecnológico station. The commuter line will run parallel to Avenida Las Torres and Mexican Federal Highway 15/Mexican Federal Highway 15D. The total cost of the project was estimated at $38.6 billion MXN in 2014.

Construction
The Secretariat of Communications and Transportation (SCT) divided the project into three sections for contractors to bid on:

Section 1 covers the western terminal in Zinacantepec to the eastern tunnel entrance at Sierra de las Cruces. This encompasses  of the project. The contracts were awarded to La Peninsular Compañía Constructora and Constructora de Proyectos Viales de México.

Section 2 is the  tunnel portion underneath Sierra de las Cruces.  was awarded the contract.

Section 3 involves the  Mexico City portion from the western tunnel entrance at Sierra de las Cruces to the Metro Observatorio Station. The contract was awarded to a consortium.

For its rolling stock, Spanish manufacturing company CAF was awarded a contract in 2014 to construct 30 EMUs for $11.6 billion MXN (€690 million). Deliveries for the trainsets began in January 2017.

The train depot will be located west of Zinacantepec station at a cost of MXN942 million. The contract was awarded to a consortium in March 2016.

In July 2014, a formal ceremony was carried out by the head of SCT, Gerardo Ruiz Esparza, to mark the start of construction.

There have been several construction accidents during the project. On 4 May 2016, the temporary support structures gave way, causing the concrete decking to collapse near the intersection of Avenida Las Torres and Avenida Colón in Toluca. On 2 June 2016, bad weather caused concrete-reinforced rebar to fold onto traffic near the intersection of Avenida Las Torres and Avenida Díaz Mirón in Toluca. On 7 July 2016, a work site caved in killing one worker and injuring two. On 16 July 2016, a construction worker was killed when a truck lost control and struck the worker on a construction site in Metepec.

In July 2019, the SCT determined the project's completion would be delayed to the end of 2022. Javier Jiménez Espriú, head of the SCT, announced the project was 87% complete, however, there have been cost overruns from $42.72 billion MXN in 2015 to $73.72 billion MXN in 2019. As of October 2020, it was estimated to open in 2023.

See also
 Suburban Railway of the Valley of Mexico Metropolitan Area

References

External links
Tren InterUrbano 
SCT — Tren Interurbano México-Toluca 

Railway companies of Mexico
Proposed rail infrastructure in Mexico
Rail transportation in Mexico City
Standard gauge railways in Mexico
Electric railways in Mexico
2023 in rail transport
Toluca